Wael Jallouz (born 3 May 1991) is a retired Tunisian handball player.

Club career
Jallouz participated on the AS Hammamet team that won the Tunisian National Cup in 2012 after defeating in the final ES Sahel HC, the recent winner of the 2012 African Cup Winner's Cup, by 26–25. That was the club's first title since foundation in 1945.

He competed for Mudhar Club at the 2012 Super Globe where he scored 26 goals in five matches and was awarded man of the match against THW Kiel after scoring eight times. Kiel was so impressed, they offered him a contract for the following season.

International career
Jallouz debuted for the Tunisian national team in 2010. 

He was part of his country's squad at the 2012 Summer Olympics in London, where the team reached the quarter finals, and the 2016 Summer Olympics.

Honours

National team
Junior World Championship
 Bronze medalist: 2011 Greece

Club
IHF Super Globe
 Winner: 2014
German Bundesliga
 Winner: 2013–14
Supercopa ASOBAL
 Winner: 2014, 2015
Tunisia National Cup
 Winner: 2012
Supercopa Catalunya
 Winner: 2014, 2015
Copa ASOBAL
 Winner: 2014–15

References

External links

1991 births
Living people
Tunisian male handball players
Olympic handball players of Tunisia
Handball players at the 2012 Summer Olympics
Handball players at the 2016 Summer Olympics
Expatriate handball players
Tunisian expatriate sportspeople in France
Tunisian expatriate sportspeople in Germany
Tunisian expatriate sportspeople in Saudi Arabia
Tunisian expatriate sportspeople in Spain
Handball-Bundesliga players
THW Kiel players
Liga ASOBAL players
FC Barcelona Handbol players
Füchse Berlin Reinickendorf HBC players
Mediterranean Games competitors for Tunisia
Competitors at the 2013 Mediterranean Games